Elżbieta Pleszczyńska (born 20 March 1933) is a Polish full professor of statistics, activist of disability rights movement.

Biography 
She gained an M.Sc. in mathematics at University of Warsaw, Faculty of Mathematics, Physics and Chemistry in 1956. She held position at Institute of Mathematics PAS until 1972. She received her Ph.D. in 1965 in the area of discriminant analysis ("Power of Test, and Separability of Hypothesis in Statistical Design of Experiments"). Her habilitation thesis, titled "Trend Estimation Problems in Time Series Analysis", was accepted in 1973.

In 1967/8 she was visiting researcher in University of Wales (Great Britain), and in 1971/2 in University of Montreal. In 1973 she moved to the Institute of Computer Science, PAS. In 1977, 1979 and 1989 she was awarded by the Polish Academy of Science. In 1981 she visited Italy invited by CNR. In the 1990s she started (together with her team) so called grade data analysis, a science of applying copula and rank methods to problems of correspondence and cluster analysis together with outlier detection. (The adjective grade here honors statisticians of the first half of the 20th century, who called cumulative distribution functions in this way.) In 1993 the President of the Republic of Poland awarded Elżbieta Pleszczyńska with the Full Professor title in the area of mathematics. In 2000 she was an invited consultant of the Cambridge University.

In the Institute of Computer Science PAS, she had been leader of the Statistical Data Analysis division for many years. According to the Polish law, professors in PAS must retire at the age of 70. Retirement in 2003, although a bit confusing, didn't stop her scientific and social activity.

Scientific views 
Prof. Pleszczyńska is known for her criticism of the classic statistical approach. Classic parametric methods, like Pearson correlation coefficient, or least squares method produce comparable results only for comparable distribution types (in practice multivariate normal distribution is being assumed). Parametric statistical tests are derived from distribution assumptions. Classic methods fail if the input data contain strong outliers, and interpretation of their results should be different for different distribution types. In practice, the underlying assumptions are often not checked, moreover they are always violated – there is no normal distribution in the real world, because every real variable is limited (for example people cannot be –170 cm or +2 km tall), and the normal distribution implies positive probability density for every real number. In most cases the real distribution is skewed or discrete, which does not prevent people from using normal distribution methods. The extent of this violation can be measured, but its maximum accepted level is just a convention, not mathematics. The parametric methods always work out of their conditions of use. However, their results are often considered valid, which leads to "scientific" validation of false hypothesis. For the reasons mentioned above, Elżbieta Pleszczyńska is a strong advocate of explorative data analysis and non-parametric statistics, like Spearman's rho, Kendall's tau, or grade data analysis.

Selected works

Social work 
Elżbieta Pleszczyńska has cofounded Foundation Supporting Physically Disabled Mathematicians and Computer Specialists in Warsaw (September 1990). For many years she has been the Foundation chairman.

The Foundation under her leadership was mainly interested in the professional advancement of physically disabled people via technology and remote work.

Pleszczyńska has been continuously focusing attention of the public opinion on rights of disable people, in her periodical reports.

Private life 
She had a son, journalist, and has two grandchildren. She lived in Warsaw Wola district. Since July, 2019, in elderly care.

References

External links 
 
 

Polish disability rights activists
Polish statisticians
Women statisticians
Living people
1933 births
Scientists from Warsaw